Polyipnus inermis is a species of ray-finned fish in the genus Polyipnus. It is found in the Southeast Pacific. It has a depth range of 0 - 575 m.

References

Sternoptychidae
Fish described in 1981